The girls' Optimist competition at the 2002 Asian Games in Busan was held from 3 to 9 October 2002.

Schedule
All times are Korea Standard Time (UTC+09:00)

Results
Legend
DNC — Did not come to the starting area
DNS — Did not start
OCS — On course side

References

2002 Asian Games Report, Page 582

External links
Results

Women's Optimist